Trinity Lutheran Church is a historic Lutheran church at 31-18 37th Street in Astoria, Queens, New York. It was designed by John William Cresswell Corbusier and overseen by architect George W. Conable (1866–1933). It was built in 1926 and is a one-story Collegiate Gothic style building. It is constructed of brick faced with coursed rubble aplite trimmed in cast stone. The front elevation features a recessed entry with a large window above, framed by two spires with ornate turrets. The interior is in a Gothic plan of nave and transepts. 

It was listed on the National Register of Historic Places in 2008.

Music
The church owns a 1927 Skinner pipe organ, which is still operational and used during Sunday services. The church also has a handbell choir which rings hymns, peals and processionals. Other musical activity at the church includes a choir, piano, cello and musical saw.

References

External links

Trinity Lutheran Church: Long Island City
Handbell ringing at Trinity Lutheran church: Long Island City
 

1926 establishments in New York City
20th-century Lutheran churches in the United States
Astoria, Queens
Churches completed in 1926
Churches in Queens, New York
Gothic Revival church buildings in New York City
Lutheran churches in New York City
Properties of religious function on the National Register of Historic Places in Queens, New York